Gladys Daniell (8 November 1884 – 26 July 1962) was a British fencer. She competed at the 1924 and 1928 Summer Olympics.

References

External links
 

1884 births
1962 deaths
British female fencers
Olympic fencers of Great Britain
Fencers at the 1924 Summer Olympics
Fencers at the 1928 Summer Olympics
People from Wandsworth
Sportspeople from London